Sir Philip Jack Oppenheimer (29 October 1911 – 8 October 1995) was a British diamond dealer and racehorse owner.

Philip Oppenheimer was born on 29 October 1911, the son of Otto Oppenheimer. He was educated at Harrow School and Jesus College, Cambridge, where he was captain of the boxing team.

In 1935, he married Pamela Fenn Stirling. They had one son, Anthony Oppenheimer, and one daughter.

References

External links

1911 births
1995 deaths
Alumni of Jesus College, Cambridge
20th-century British businesspeople
British racehorse owners and breeders
Businesspeople awarded knighthoods
Knights Bachelor
People educated at Harrow School
Philip